Baltimore Park is a former unincorporated community now incorporated in Larkspur in Marin County, California. It lies at an elevation of 43 feet (13 m).

References

Neighborhoods in Larkspur, California